"Suburbia Streets" is the third single released by New Zealand hip hop group Fast Crew, released in 2005 in New Zealand and in February 2006 in Australia. The song reached number 10 in New Zealand and number 31 in Australia

Track listing

Charts

Release history

References

2004 songs
2005 singles
Fast Crew songs
Warner Music Australasia singles